"Peek a Boo" is a song by American rapper Lil Yachty featuring American rap trio Migos, released as a single from Lil Yachty's album Teenage Emotions on April 14, 2017. It reached number 78 on the Billboard Hot 100 and was certified Gold by the RIAA. The music video for the song was released the same day the song was released. Before its official release, Lil Yachty released a short snippet on his Instagram account.

Lyrics
The song features Lil Yachty comparing his playing with different individuals and items to that of the game peek a boo, and referring several pop culture franchises like Pokémon and Blue's Clues.

The song received particular attention for Lil Yachty's line "She blow that dick like a cello". Many pointed out that the cello is a string instrument, not a woodwind instrument. Lil Yachty later stated to Genius that he thought a cello was a woodwind instrument, and blamed his A&R for "listen[ing] to that song many times" and "allow[ing him] to say that". While trying to explain the line, Lil Yachty attracted further ridicule; he said he "thought Squidward played the cello, he don't, that's a flute", as Squidward actually plays a clarinet.

Charts

Certifications

References

2017 songs
2017 singles
Lil Yachty songs
Migos songs
Songs written by Lil Yachty
Songs written by Quavo
Songs written by Offset (rapper)
Songs written by Takeoff (rapper)